The Athletics Association of Guyana (AAG) is the governing body for the sport of athletics in Guyana.  Current president is Aubrey Hutson.  He was elected in 2013.

History 
AAG was founded in 1948.

Former president until 2013 was Colin Boyce.  He was elected in 2009.

Affiliations 
AAG is the national member federation for Guyana in the following international organisations:
World Athletics
Confederación Sudamericana de Atletismo (CONSUDATLE; South American Athletics Confederation)
Association of Panamerican Athletics (APA)
Central American and Caribbean Athletic Confederation (CACAC)
Moreover, it is part of the following national organisations:
Guyana Olympic Association

National records 
AAG maintains the Guyanese records in athletics.

References 

Guyana
Athletics
National governing bodies for athletics
Sports organizations established in 1948